Crisóstomo Martínez (1638–1694) was a Spanish painter, engraver, anatomist and microscopist from Valencia, known for his atlas of anatomy. His work has been ascribed to the Spanish intellectual movement called "Novator" which refers to the beginnings of the scientific revolution in the Kingdom of Spain in the late seventeenth century. The most innovative aspect of his work was an interest in embryology and microscopy, which he applied to the study of "fresh" osteology.

Bibliography
 GARCÍA MARTÍNEZ, S. "La cátedra valenciana de anatomía durante el último tercio del siglo XVII", en: Actas del III Congreso Nacional de HIstoria de la Medicina, Valencia, 1969, Vol II, pp. 167–185.

 LÓPEZ PIÑERO, José María, El Atlas Anatómico de Crisóstomo Martínez, Valencia, Ayuntamiento de Valencia, 3ªed. 2001.
 LÓPEZ TERRADA, M.J. y JEREZ MOLINER, F. «El "atlas anatómico" de Crisóstomo Martínez como ejemplo de "Vanitas"», Boletín del Museo e Instituto Camón Aznar, 1994, 56:5-34

 VELASCO MORGADO, Raúl, "Aportaciones al conocimiento de Crisóstomo Martínez y su "atlas de anatomía", Asclepio, 212; 64(1): 189-212.

1638 births
1694 deaths
Painters from the Valencian Community
Histologists
17th-century engravers